The 1985 Senior League World Series took place from August 12–18 in Gary, Indiana, United States. Pingtung, Taiwan defeated Curaçao, Netherlands Antilles in the championship game.

This was the final SLWS held in Gary.

Teams

Results

References

Senior League World Series
Senior League World Series
1985 in sports in Indiana